David Lee Miller (born 1951) is a scholar of English Renaissance Literature. He is Distinguished Professor of English and Comparative Literature at the University of South Carolina in Columbia. His works include The Poem's Two Bodies: The Poetics of the 1590 Faerie Queen, (Princeton UP, 1988); Dreams of the Burning Child: Sacrificial Sons and the Father's Witness (Cornell UP, 2003); three edited books; and about two dozen refereed articles that have appeared in scholarly journals such as Modern Language Quarterly, English Literary History, and Publications of the Modern Language Association. He is one of four general editors of The Collected Works of Edmund Spenser, a new scholarly edition under contract to Oxford University Press.

Miller's work has been especially devoted to the canon of Edmund Spenser, a contemporary of Shakespeare's whose Faerie Queene is considered one of the two or three greatest epic poems in the language. Spenser was the subject of The Poem's Two Bodies in 1988, and Miller is helping to prepare a new scholarly edition of the English poet. In many of the articles, particularly in Dreams of the Burning Child, Miller ranges through ancient, early modern, and modern literatures and through both popular and high cultures to demonstrate the central thesis that Western culture is fixated on the sacrifice of sons as a means of shoring up patriarchal authority.

Prior to moving to South Carolina, Miller taught at the University of Alabama from 1978 until 1994, and at the University of Kentucky from 1994 until 2004.

After growing up in San Diego, California, he was educated at Yale University and the University of California, Irvine. He has won fellowships from the John Simon Guggenheim Memorial Foundation, the National Endowment for the Humanities, and the Andrew W. Mellon Foundation.

References

1951 births
Living people
American academics of English literature